Madecassia is a genus of beetles in the family Buprestidae, containing the following species:

 Madecassia fairmairei (Obenberger, 1958)
 Madecassia ophthalmica (Fairmaire, 1904)
 Madecassia rothschildi (Gahan, 1893)

References

Buprestidae genera